This is a list of sister cities in the United States state of Washington. Sister cities, known in Europe as town twins, are cities which partner with each other to promote human contact and cultural links, although this partnering is not limited to cities and often includes counties, regions, states and other sub-national entities.

Many Washington jurisdictions work with foreign cities through Sister Cities International, an organization whose goal is to "promote peace through mutual respect, understanding, and cooperation."

A
Anacortes

 Lomonosov, Russia
 Nikaho, Japan
 Sidney, Canada
 Vela Luka, Croatia

Auburn

 Guanghan, China
 Mola di Bari, Italy
 Pyeongchang, South Korea
 Tamba, Japan
 Yuhang (Hangzhou), China

B
Bainbridge Island

 Altagracia, Nicaragua
 Moyogalpa, Nicaragua

Bellevue

 Hualien, Taiwan
 Kladno, Czech Republic
 Liepāja, Latvia
 Yao, Japan

Bellingham

 Cheongju, South Korea
 Nakhodka, Russia
 Port Stephens, Australia
 Punta Arenas, Chile
 Tateyama, Japan
 Tsetserleg, Mongolia
 Vaasa, Finland

Bremerton
 Kure, Japan

C
Camas

 Hamamatsu, Japan
 Krapkowice, Poland
 Morawica, Poland
 Taki, Japan
 Zabierzów, Poland

Chehalis
 Hamamatsu, Japan

Chelan
 Katō, Japan

Covington
 Tatsuno, Japan

E
East Wenatchee
 Misawa, Japan

Edmonds
 Hekinan, Japan

Everett

 Iwakuni, Japan
 Sligo, Ireland
 Sovetskaya Gavan, Russia

F
Federal Way

 Donghae, South Korea
 Hachinohe, Japan

Ferndale
 Minamibōsō, Japan

I
Issaquah

 Chefchaouen, Morocco
 Sunndal, Norway

K
Kelso 

 Kelso, Scotland, United Kingdom
 Makinohara, Japan

Kennewick
 Taoyuan, Taiwan

Kent

 Sunnfjord, Norway
 Tamba, Japan
 Yangzhou, China

L
La Conner
 Olga, Russia

Lacey
 Mińsk Mazowiecki, Poland

Lakewood

 Bauang, Philippines
 Okinawa, Japan

Longview
 Wakō, Japan

Lynnwood
 Damyang, South Korea

M
Mercer Island
 Thonon-les-Bains, France

Moses Lake
 Yonezawa, Japan

Mount Vernon

 Chilliwack, Canada
 Matsushige, Japan

O
Olympia

 Katō, Japan
 Nanchang, China
 Rafah, Palestine

Othello
 Wulensi, Ghana

P
Point Roberts
 Campobello Island, Canada

Port Angeles
 Mutsu, Japan

Port Townsend

 Ichikawa, Japan
 Sooke, Canada

Pullman
 Kasai, Japan

R
Renton

 Cuautla, Mexico
 Nishiwaki, Japan

Richland
 Hsinchu, Taiwan

S
Seattle

 Beersheba, Israel
 Bergen, Norway
 Cebu, Philippines
 Chongqing, China
 Christchurch, New Zealand
 Daejeon, South Korea
 Galway, Ireland
 Gdynia, Poland
 Haiphong, Vietnam
 Kaohsiung, Taiwan
 Kobe, Japan
 Limbe, Cameroon
 Mombasa, Kenya
 Nantes, France
 Pécs, Hungary
 Perugia, Italy
 Reykjavik, Iceland
 Sihanoukville, Cambodia
 Surabaya, Indonesia
 Tashkent, Uzbekistan

Sequim
 Shisō, Japan

Shoreline
 Boryeong, South Korea

Snoqualmie

 Chaclacayo, Peru
 Gangjin, South Korea

Spokane

 Cagli, Italy
 Jecheon, South Korea
 Jilin City, China
 Limerick, Ireland
 Nishinomiya, Japan

T
Tacoma

 Ålesund, Norway
 Biot, France
 Boca del Río, Mexico
 Brovary, Ukraine
 Cienfuegos, Cuba
 Davao City, Philippines
 Fuzhou, China
 George, South Africa
 Gunsan, South Korea
 El Jadida, Morocco
 Kitakyushu, Japan
 Taichung, Taiwan
 Vladivostok, Russia

Tukwila
 Miyoshi, Japan

V
Vancouver
 Jōyō, Japan

W
Walla Walla
 Tamba-Sasayama, Japan

Wenatchee

 Misawa, Japan
 Naju, South Korea

Y
Yakima

 Derbent, Russia
 Itayanagi, Japan
 Keelung, Taiwan
 Morelia, Mexico

References

Washington
Cities in Washington (state)
Populated places in Washington (state)
Washington (state) geography-related lists